Felicia Stancil (born May 18, 1995) is an American female  BMX rider. Stancil has won 14 UCI World Titles including the 2012 UCI BMX World Championships titles for Junior Women and the Junior Women Time Trial in Birmingham, United Kingdom. A year later she successfully defended both titles at the 2013 UCI BMX World Championships in New Zealand. At the 2015 Pan American Games, Stancil won gold in her first international win as a professional. The win resulted in the first gold medal won by the United States at the 2015 games. After reaching the final in all ten races on the 2019 UCI BMX Supercross World Cup series, Stancil finished out the year 2nd in the overall standings. Adding on to her successful 2019, Stancil was awarded the 2019 Golden Crank Pro of the Year Title by Pull Magazine.

Racing career

World Championship titles 
2004: 9 Girls 
2005: 10 Girls 
2007: 12 Girls
2007: 12 & Under Girls Cruiser
2009: 14 Girls 
2009: 13 & 14 Girls Cruiser
2010: 15 Girls 
2010: 15 & 16 Girls Cruiser 
2011: 16 Girls 
2011: 15 & 16 Girls Cruiser 
2012: Junior Women
2012: Junior Women Time Trial
2013: Junior Women
2013: Junior Women Time Trial

Collegiate career 
Felicia attended Marian University in Indiana from 2013 to 2018 where she won the USA Cycling Collegiate BMX National Championship individual title in 2014, 2015 and 2018. Stancil graduated from Marian with a degree in biology and a minor in business in 2018.

Personal life 
Stancil grew up in Lake Villa, Illinois where she graduated from Grayslake North High School. Felicia started BMX when she was 4 years old, taking up after her father who was also a professional BMX rider. Besides BMX, Stancil also played volleyball, basketball, floor hockey and track & field growing up. She now resides in Indianapolis, Indiana.

References

External links 
 
 
 
 
 

1995 births
Living people
BMX riders
American female cyclists
Olympic cyclists of the United States
Cyclists at the 2020 Summer Olympics
Pan American Games medalists in cycling
Pan American Games gold medalists for the United States
Cyclists at the 2015 Pan American Games
Medalists at the 2015 Pan American Games
UCI BMX World Champions (elite women)
21st-century American women